Conduct unbecoming an officer and a gentleman (or conduct unbecoming for short) is an offense that is subject to court martial in the armed forces of some nations.

Use in the United Kingdom
The phrase was used as a charge in courts martial of the British Armed Forces in the 18th and early 19th centuries, although it was not defined as a specific offence in the Articles of War. For instance, in 1813, Colonel Sir J Eamer was brought before a court martial "For behaving in a scandalous, infamous manner, such as is unbecoming the character of an officer and a gentleman, towards Captain B V Symes of the same regiment..." The charge seems to have been first codified  under the Naval Discipline Act of 10 August 1860, which says; "Article 24: Every Officer subject to this Act who shall be guilty of Cruelty, or of any scandalous or fraudulent Conduct, shall be dismissed with Disgrace from Her Majesty's Service; and every Officer subject to this Act who shall be guilty of any other Conduct unbecoming the Character of an Officer shall be dismissed, with or without Disgrace, from Her Majesty's Service."

Use in the United States

The elements are:
 That the accused did or omitted to do certain acts; and
 That, in the circumstances, these acts or omissions constituted conduct unbecoming an officer and gentleman.

Here "officer" is understood to include commissioned officers, cadets, and midshipmen of both sexes, hence the more common term conduct unbecoming. A gentleman is understood to have a duty to avoid dishonest acts, displays of indecency, lawlessness, dealing unfairly, indecorum, injustice, or acts of cruelty.

Police discipline 
"Conduct unbecoming an officer" is also used in some civil police agencies.

See also 
 A Few Good Men, 1992 film centring around a trial for this offence
 An Officer and a Gentleman, 1982 film
 Conduct prejudicial to good order and discipline
 Conduct Unbecoming, 1975 film based on a play by Barry England
 Military tradition
 Unsportsmanlike conduct, a cautionable offence in association football, until 1997 called "ungentlemanly conduct".

References

United States military law
Court-martial